Forme may refer to the following:
Forme (printing), a chase with type locked up ready for printing
Forme, Škofja Loka, a settlement in Slovenia
Forme Tour, a professional golf tour

See also
 FORM (disambiguation)
 Form (disambiguation)